Geoffrey Keith Pullum (born 8 March 1945) is a British and American linguist specialising in the study of English. He is Professor Emeritus of General Linguistics at the University of Edinburgh.

Pullum is a co-author of The Cambridge Grammar of the English Language (2002), a comprehensive descriptive grammar of English. He was also a contributor to Language Log and Lingua Franca at The Chronicle of Higher Education.

Early life and education 
Geoffrey K. Pullum was born in Irvine, North Ayrshire, Scotland, on 8 March 1945, and moved to West Wickham, England, while very young. He left secondary school at age 16 and toured Germany as a pianist in the rock and roll band Sonny Stewart and the Dynamos. A year and a half later, he returned to England and co-founded a soul band, Geno Washington & the Ram Jam Band, with Pete Gage.

After the band broke up, Pullum enrolled in the University of York in 1968, graduating in 1972 with a Bachelor of Arts with first class honours. In 1976 he completed a PhD in Linguistics at University College London.

Career
Pullum left Britain in 1980, taking visiting positions at the University of Washington and Stanford University. In 1987, he became a United States citizen. He worked at the University of California, Santa Cruz, from 1981 to 2007.

In 1995, Pullum started to collaborate with Rodney Huddleston and other linguists on The Cambridge Grammar of the English Language, which won the Leonard Bloomfield Book Award of the Linguistic Society of America in 2004.

In 2000, he published, in the style of Dr. Seuss, a proof of Turing's theorem that the halting problem is recursively unsolvable.

In 2003, he was elected a Fellow of the American Academy of Arts and Sciences and in 2009 a Fellow of the British Academy.

In 2007, he moved to the School of Philosophy, Psychology and Language Sciences, University of Edinburgh, where he was Professor of General Linguistics and at one time Head of Linguistics and English Language.

Selected publications 
 Pullum, Geoffrey K. (1977). Cole, P.; Sadock, J. M. (eds.). "Word order universals and grammatical relations". Syntax and Semantics. 8: 249–277. .
 Derbyshire, Desmond C.; Pullum, Geoffrey K. (1979). "Object initial languages". Work Papers of the Summer Institute of Linguistics, University of North Dakota Session. 23 (2). .
 Pullum, Geoffrey K. (1979). Rule interaction and the organization of a grammar. Outstanding dissertations in linguistics. New York: Garland. .
 Gazdar, Gerald; Klein, Ewan; Pullum, Geoffrey K.; and Sag, Ivan A. (1985). Generalized phrase structure grammar. Basil Blackwell, Oxford. 
 Pullum, Geoffrey K., and Ladusaw, William A. (1986). Phonetic Symbol Guide, University of Chicago Press. 
 2nd ed (1986). .
  (Sekai onsei kigō jiten). Tokyo: Sanseido (2003). .
 Pullum, Geoffrey K. (1991). The Great Eskimo Vocabulary Hoax and Other Irreverent Essays on the Study of Language, University of Chicago Press. . (See also Eskimo words for snow)
 Huddleston, Rodney D., and Pullum, Geoffrey K. (2002). The Cambridge Grammar of the English Language, Cambridge University Press. 
 Huddleston, Rodney D.; Pullum, Geoffrey K.; Reynolds, Brett (2022). A student's introduction to English grammar (2 ed.). Cambridge: Cambridge University Press. p. 157. .
 Liberman, Mark, and Pullum, Geoffrey K. (2006). Far from the Madding Gerund and Other Dispatches from the Language Log, William, James & Company. 
Pullum, Geoffrey K. (2018). Linguistics: Why it matters. Cambridge: Polity.

References

External links 
 
 Language Log

1945 births
Living people
Linguists from the United States
Linguists from the United Kingdom
Syntacticians
Scottish emigrants to the United States
University of California, Santa Cruz faculty
Alumni of University College London
Academics of the University of Edinburgh
People from Irvine, North Ayrshire
Fellows of the American Academy of Arts and Sciences
Fellows of the British Academy
Alumni of the University of York
People educated at Eltham College
British rhythm and blues boom musicians
British soul musicians
Philosophers of linguistics
Fellows of the Linguistic Society of America